Lochmaeotrochus is a genus of cnidarians belonging to the family Caryophylliidae.

The species of this genus are found in Southeastern Asia and Australia.

Species:

Lochmaeotrochus gardineri 
Lochmaeotrochus micrommatus 
Lochmaeotrochus oculeus

References

Caryophylliidae
Scleractinia genera